Reum is a surname. Notable people with the surname include:

Carter Reum (born 1981), American entrepreneur
Courtney Reum, American entrepreneur
Walter J. Reum (1914–1999), American lawyer, politician, and writer

See also
Reem (given name)